Bader Abdul Rahman Al-Fulaij (born 14 June 1977) is a Kuwaiti sprinter. He competed in the men's 4 × 400 metres relay at the 2000 Summer Olympics.

References

External links
 

1977 births
Living people
Athletes (track and field) at the 2000 Summer Olympics
Kuwaiti male sprinters
Olympic athletes of Kuwait
Place of birth missing (living people)